John Harvard Christopher Laurence (born 15 April 1929) was  Archdeacon of Lindsey from 1985 until 1994.

Laurence was educated at Christ's Hospital, Trinity Hall, Cambridge and Westcott House, Cambridge. He was an officer in the Royal Lincolnshire Regiment from 1948 to 1950. After a curacy at St Nicholas, Lincoln he was Vicar of St George, Scunthorpe from 1959 to 1973. He was St Hugh's Missioner for the Diocese of Lincoln from 1974 to 1979; and the Bishop of London's Director of Clergy Training, from 1979 to 1985.

Notes

1929 births
Living people
Archdeacons of Lindsey
20th-century English Anglican priests
21st-century English Anglican priests
People educated at Christ's Hospital
Alumni of Trinity Hall, Cambridge
Alumni of Westcott House, Cambridge
Royal Lincolnshire Regiment officers